Montana Highway 25 (MT 25) is a  state highway located in the U.S. State of Montana in the east part of the state.

Route description

Highway 25's western terminus is at U.S. Route 2 in Wolf Point, Montana. The route heads northeast parallel to US 2 and a railroad. After bending southeastward, it passes the Lyman Clayton Airport and the Airport Golf Club, ending at Montana Highway 13, just to the north of the Missouri River.

History
During the 1930s, an old alignment of Highway 25 existed from Lewistown to Billings.

Major intersections

See also

References

External links

025